Nowmal (also Romanized as Namul and Noomel) is a village in Estarabad-e Jonubi Rural District, in the Central District of Gorgan County, Golestan Province, Iran. As of the 2006 census, its population was 1,329 in 354 families.

References 

Populated places in Gorgan County